Milan Grman is a male former international table tennis player from Slovakia.

He won a bronze medal at the 1991 World Table Tennis Championships in the Swaythling Cup (men's team event) with Tomáš Janči, Petr Javurek, Petr Korbel and Roland Vimi for Czechoslovakia.

See also
 List of table tennis players
 List of World Table Tennis Championships medalists

References

Sportspeople from Topoľčany
Slovak male table tennis players
1969 births
Living people
World Table Tennis Championships medalists